Clanculus maugeri is a species of sea snail, a marine gastropod mollusk in the family Trochidae, the top snails.

Description
The height of the shell varies between 20 mm and 26 mm, its diameter measures 25 mm. The solid, thick shell has a conical shape carinated with nearly straight sides and is false-umbilicate. This species is more strictly conical than usual in Clanculus. It  has a reddish or yellowish-brown color, more or less dotted minutely with a slightly darker shade. The about 8 whorls are flat above The sutures are scarcely marked. The first whorls of the apex when not smooth by erosion are spirally lirate. These lirae are dotted with red. The succeeding whorls are very closely, finely granulate in spiral series. The fine granulation is nearly
uniform. Its color is minutely dotted with darker and beneath usually with white. These are characters separating Clanculus maugeri from other species in this genus. The body whorl has about 7 rows of granules above. It is carinate at the periphery and slightly deflected anteriorly. The base of the shell is nearly flat with numerous (15 to 20) close finely beaded concentric lirulae. The tetragonal aperture is very oblique. The upper lip is straightened and wrinkled within. The outer and basal lips are thick, curved and crenulate within. The columella is very oblique.  Its edge is denticulate, slightly tortuous above, and inserted in the center of the axis. Below it terminates in an acute or squarish narrow tooth. The parietal wall and the umbilicus are rugose, the latter bounded by a plicate-denticulate rib.

Distribution
This marine species is endemic to Australia and occurs in the subtidal and intertidal zone off New South Wales, Tasmania and Victoria

References

 Wood, W. 1828. Index Testaceologicus; or A Catalogue of Shells, British and Foreign, arranged according to the Linnean system. London : Taylor Supplement, 1-59, pls 1-8.
 Philippi, R.A. 1852. Trochidae. pp. 233–248 in Küster, H.C. (ed). Systematisches Conchylien-Cabinet von Martini und Chemnitz. Nürnberg : Bauer & Raspe Vol. 2.
 Adams, A. 1853. Contributions towards a monograph of the Trochidae, a family of gastropodous Mollusca. Proceedings of the Zoological Society of London 1851(19): 150-192
 Angas, G.F. 1867. A list of species of marine Mollusca found in Port Jackson harbour, New South Wales and on the adjacent coasts, with notes on their habits etc. Proceedings of the Zoological Society of London 1867: 185-233, 912-935 
 Fischer, P. 1877. Genres Calcar, Trochus, Xenophora, Tectarius et Risella. pp. 115–240 in Keiner, L.C. (ed.). Spécies general et iconographie des coquilles vivantes. Paris : J.B. Baillière Vol. 11
 Watson, R.B. 1886. Report on the Scaphopoda and Gastropoda collected by the H.M.S. "Challenger" during the years 1873-1876. Report on the Scientific Results of the Voyage of H.M.S. Challenger 1873–1876, Zoology 15(42): 756 pp., 50 pls
 Whitelegge, T. 1889. List of the Marine and Freshwater Invertebrate Fauna of Port Jackson and the Neighbourhood. Journal and Proceedings of the Royal Society of New South Wales 23: 1-161 
 Tate, R. & May, W.L. 1901. A revised census of the marine Mollusca of Tasmania. Proceedings of the Linnean Society of New South Wales 26(3): 344-471
 Pritchard, G.B. & Gatliff, J.H. 1902. Catalogue of the marine shells of Victoria. Part V. Proceedings of the Royal Society of Victoria 14(2): 85-138 
 Hedley, C. 1918. A checklist of the marine fauna of New South Wales. Part 1. Journal and Proceedings of the Royal Society of New South Wales 51: M1-M120
 May, W.L. 1921. A Checklist of the Mollusca of Tasmania. Hobart, Tasmania : Government Printer 114 pp.
 May, W.L. 1923. An Illustrated Index of Tasmanian Shells. Hobart : Government Printer 100 pp.
 Iredale, T. 1924. Results from Roy Bell's molluscan collections. Proceedings of the Linnean Society of New South Wales 49(3): 179-279, pl. 33-36
 Allan, J.K. 1950. Australian Shells: with related animals living in the sea, in freshwater and on the land. Melbourne : Georgian House xix, 470 pp., 45 pls, 112 text figs.
 Macpherson, J.H. & Gabriel, C.J. 1962. Marine Molluscs of Victoria. Melbourne : Melbourne University Press & National Museum of Victoria 475 pp
 Iredale, T. & McMichael, D.F. 1962. A reference list of the marine Mollusca of New South Wales. Memoirs of the Australian Museum 11: 1-109
 Wilson, B. 1993. Australian Marine Shells. Prosobranch Gastropods. Kallaroo, Western Australia : Odyssey Publishing Vol. 1 408 pp.
 Jansen, P. 1995. A review of the genus Clanculus Montfort, 1810 (Gastropoda: Trochidae) in Australia, with description of a new subspecies and the introduction of a nomen novum. Vita Marina 43(1-2): 39-62

External links
 To Biodiversity Heritage Library (7 publications)
 To World Register of Marine Species

maugeri
Gastropods of Australia
Gastropods described in 1828